SIC Radical is a Portuguese  basic cable and satellite television channel owned by Sociedade Independente de Comunicação.

SIC Radical is an entertainment channel targeted at teens and young adults. SIC Radical programins have shift through its history, Curto Circuito being its iconic TV show, being present along with sci-fi series, anime, britcoms, talk-shows, erotic programming and amateur television. Along with originals, it airs several television shows from the United States and the United Kingdom. SIC Radical also shows reruns of popular TV-shows and does live coverage of the most important music festivals in Portugal.

In May 2016, SIC Radical launched a Full HD channel to broadcast some Rock in Rio Lisboa shows.

Programming

Portuguese TV shows
 Curto Circuito
 Very Typical
 Irritações 
 Falta de Chá

TV series

 Anthony Bourdain: No Reservations
 Bad Girls Club
 Balls of Steel
 Baywatch
 Bizarre Foods with Andrew Zimmern
 Boomtown
 Cathouse
 Clone High (also on Biggs)
 Commercial Breakdown
 Criss Angel Mindfreak
 Dark Angel
 Doctor Who (now on Syfy)
 Dr. Katz, Professional Therapist
 Face Off
 Family Guy (now on Fox and Fox Comedy)
 Física o Química
 Hell's Kitchen
 Home Movies
 How Not to Live Your Life
 Life as We Know It
 MANswers
 Man v. Food
 Merlin (also on SIC K)
 Monkey Dust
 Odyssey 5
 O Negócio
 Point Pleasant
 Pulling
 Seinfeld
 Sexcetera
 Shameless
 Sliders
 South Park (also on MTV)
 Testees
 The Amazing Race
 The Apprentice
 The Cult
 The F Word
 The Jon Dore Television Show
 The King of Queens
 Torchwood
 Unbeatable Banzuke
 Undercover Boss
 Undergrads (also on Biggs)
 Winners & Losers

Anime

 Basilisk 
 Bleach* (previously on SIC K)
 Boruto: Naruto Next Generations*
 Burst Angel
 Chrono Crusade
 Cowboy Bebop
 Darker Than Black (also on SIC K)
 Desert Punk
 Death Note (previously on Animax)
 Dragon Ball*  (previously on SIC, SIC Gold and also on SIC K)
 Dragon Ball Z* (previously on SIC, SIC Gold and also on SIC K)
 Dragon Ball GT* (previously on SIC, SIC Gold and also on SIC K)
 Dragon Ball Kai
 Dragon Ball Super* (previously on SIC and also on SIC K and Biggs)
 Vision of Escaflowne (also on Canal Panda)
 Excel Saga
 Fairy Tail* (previously on SIC K)
 Fullmetal Alchemist
 Fullmetal Alchemist: Brotherhood (also on SIC K)
 Fullmetal Alchemist the Movie: Conqueror of Shamballa
 Gad Guard
 Golden Boy
 Ghost in the Shell
 Haikyū!!*
 Hellsing
 Kiddy Grade
 Last Exile
 Najica
 Naruto (also on SIC K, SIC and Animax)
 Naruto Shippuden*** (also on SIC K and Animax)
 Neon Genesis Evangelion
 Noir
 One Piece** (previously on SIC and also on Panda Biggs)
 Outlaw Star
 RahXephon
 Saint Seiya: The Lost Canvas
 Soul Taker
 Trigun
 Trinity Blood
 Urusei Yatsura (previously on SIC)
 Wolverine 
 Zaion

(*) Indicates anime marked as aired with Portuguese dubbing
(**) Indicates anime marked as aired with Portuguese dubbing and in the original Japanese audio with Portuguese subtitles
(***) Indicates anime marked as aired in the original Japanese audio with Portuguese subtitles and with Portuguese dubbing

Sports
 Bellator MMA
 Red Bull Air Race World Championship
 Brasileirão

Music festivals
 Rock in Rio Lisboa
 Super Bock Super Rock

Talk-shows

 The Tonight Show starring Jimmy Fallon
 Late Show with Stephen Colbert

References

External links
 Official Site 
 Official Facebook Page
 Official MySpace Page
 Official Twitter Page

Television stations in Portugal
Portuguese-language television stations
Television channels and stations established in 2001
2001 establishments in Portugal
Sociedade Independente de Comunicação